Mafraq ( Muhāfaẓat al-Mafraq, local dialects Mafrag or Mafra' ) is one of the governorates of Jordan, located to the north-east of Amman, capital of Jordan. It has a population of 287,300 (2010 estimate) making up 4.5% of Jordan's population. Its capital is Mafraq, which is known for its military bases.

History

Many Roman and Byzantine sites have been found throughout the governorate, most notably churches dating to the third century AD;  believed to be two of the oldest purpose built churches in Christianity: and Roman water dams in Jawa, Ruwaished, and the city of Mafraq.  The Jawa Dam is the oldest known dam in the world, dating back to 3000 B.C. Mafraq city also contains a Roman fort.

During the British mandate period, Mafraq housed military facilities which are still in use today. The fifth division of the Jordanian Army is stationed in Mafraq.

Geography
The province is located in the eastern part of the kingdom of Jordan. It is the only governorate in Jordan that has borders with three countries: Iraq to the east, Syria to the north, and Saudi Arabia to the south. It is bordered by Irbid and Jerash governorates to the west, and by Zarqa governorate to the south.

Mafraq governorate covers the second largest area in the kingdom, but yet the second smallest population density (after Ma'an). The climate is dry most of the year. The western region of the province is part of the fertile Houran plateaus, that extend through southern Syria, the Golan heights and northern Jordan. The eastern region is part of the barren Syrian Desert. At the eastern edge of the region is the 940m high  (or 'Unayzah), at the border tripoint between Jordan, Iraq and Saudi Arabia.
 
The Governorate is connected to Iraq through the Karameh Border Crossing, and to Syria through the Jabir Border Crossing.

Demographics
The population of Mafraq Governorate according to the census of 2004 was 244,188 of whom 30% is considered urban and 70% is rural. Jordanian citizens made up about 94% of the population. The Jordanian Department of Statistics population estimate for the year 2010 is 287,300 with a female to male ratio of 48.17 to 51.83 and a population density of 10.8 persons per km2.  In 2011 and 2012, the civil war in Syria resulted in the immigration of more than 180,000 Syrian refugees to Jordan, mostly settled in Mafraq and Irbid Governorates.  In July 2012, the Zaatari refugee camp was opened in Mafraq Governorate for Syrian refugees. The World Bank 2018 estimate records the population now at 593,900 people.

The population of districts according to census results:

Administrative divisions
Mafraq Governorate is divided into four districts (liwa) and fourteen sub-districts (qda):

Economy
Agriculture forms a central element of the economy for Mafraq Governorate, especially in the Houran Plateau in the western part of the province. The total area of fruit farms in the province in 2008 was 48.676 km2, with a total production of 101874 tons of fruits mainly apples and peaches, according to the ministry of Agriculture. The total area of vegetable farms in the province for 2008 was 8.295 km2 with a total production of 15540 tons, with cabbage, onions, garlic, and lettuce being the main products.

There is one natural gas production field at Al-Reeshah, it is run by the Jordanian National Petroleum Company. The natural gas produced at Al-Reeshah is used entirely for producing electricity at a nearby electricity generating station with a capacity of 120 Megawatts, covering 12% of the total needs of the kingdom for the year 2008.

The city of Mafraq hosts Al al-Bayt University, which is the only university in the governorate.

See also
Safawi, Jordan, a town
Umm el-Jimal, village with ancient ruins

References

 
Governorates of Jordan